Bai Lu may refer to:

Bai Lü (born 1961), Chinese general
Bai Lu (actress) (born 1994), Chinese actress
Bãi Lữ, a seaside resort in Cửa Lò, Nghệ An Province, Vietnam

See also
Bailu (disambiguation)